Bulbophyllum multivaginatum is a species of orchid in the genus Bulbophyllum.

References
The Bulbophyllum-Checklist
The Internet Orchid Species Photo Encyclopedia

External links

multivaginatum
Taxa named by Joseph Marie Henry Alfred Perrier de la Bâthie
Taxa named by Henri Lucien Jumelle